Chaetopogon is a genus of European plants in the grass family.

Species
The only known species is Chaetopogon fasciculatus native to Spain, Portugal, Italy, and Croatia.

formerly included
see Polypogon 
Chaetopogon creticus - Polypogon maritimus

See also 
 List of Poaceae genera

References

External links 
 Grassbase - The World Online Grass Flora

Monotypic Poaceae genera
Pooideae
Flora of Europe